The South Branch Dead River is a  tributary of the Dead River in Franklin County, Maine.

From the outflow of Saddleback Lake below Saddleback Mountain, the river runs northeast to Eustis, where its confluence with the North Branch of the Dead River was drowned by the impoundment of Flagstaff Lake in 1950.

The Northern Forest Canoe Trail (NFCT) is a  marked canoeing route extending from Old Forge, New York to Fort Kent, Maine. From a four-mile portage between Rangeley on Rangeley Lake and Dallas Plantation on the South Branch, the trail runs about  down the South Branch, Flagstaff Lake, and the Dead River, to the mouth of Spencer Stream below Grand Falls.

See also
List of rivers of Maine

References

Maine Streamflow Data from the USGS
Maine Watershed Data From Environmental Protection Agency

Tributaries of the Kennebec River
Rivers of Franklin County, Maine
Rivers of Maine
Northern Forest Canoe Trail